Nicolet-Bécancour is a provincial electoral district in the Centre-du-Québec region of Quebec, Canada that elects members to the National Assembly of Quebec.  It notably includes the municipalities of Bécancour, Nicolet, Saint-Léonard-d'Aston, Daveluyville, Pierreville, Saint-François-du-Lac, Saint-Guillaume, Saint-Pierre-les-Becquets and Saint-Wenceslas.

It was created for the 2012 election from parts of the former Nicolet-Yamaska and Lotbinière electoral districts.

Members of the National Assembly

Election results

|align="left" colspan=3 bgcolor="#FFFFFF"|Coalition Avenir Québec notional gain from Parti Québécois
|align="right" bgcolor="#FFFFFF"|Swing
|align="right" bgcolor="#FFFFFF"| +10.44

^ Change is from redistributed results; CAQ change is from ADQ

References

External links
Information
 Elections Quebec

Election results
 Election results (National Assembly)
 Election results (QuébecPolitique)

Maps
 2011 map (PDF)
2001–2011 changes to Nicolet-Yamaska (Flash)
 Electoral map of Centre-du-Québec region
 Quebec electoral map, 2011

Nicolet, Quebec
Quebec provincial electoral districts